"Breathe Into Me" is the first single by the American Christian rock band Red on their debut full-length studio album End of Silence. The song was written by Anthony Armstrong, Rob Graves, Jasen Rauch and Jason McArthur. The song was released on June 6, 2006, although it was sent to all the fans who submitted their faces as part of the hype for the new album on June 6, 2006. The song appears on WOW Hits 2008.

Background

The band said, "On our own, life can lead us to dark places full of anger, mistakes and regrets. This song is about 'falling', finally reaching the end of our rope, where we realize at last ... we need God. The chorus, 'Breathe Your life into me', is a desperate cry for help, a plea for renewal, rebirth – even resurrection. It’s about overcoming wounds and consequences we could never overcome alone."

Track listing

Digital single
 "Breathe Into Me" – 3:34

EP
 "Breathe Into Me" (radio edit) – 3:25
 "Breathe Into Me" (acoustic remix) – 3:55

Charts and certifications

Charts

Certifications

References

2006 songs
2006 debut singles
Essential Records (Christian) singles
Red (American band) songs
Songs written by Jason McArthur
Songs written by Jasen Rauch
Songs written by Rob Graves